Silverleaves is a small town on Phillip Island situated east of Cowes, Victoria.

Notes and references

Phillip Island
Towns in Victoria (Australia)
Bass Coast Shire